Volkan Arslan (born 29 August 1978) is a Turkish football coach and former player. Arslan played for Turkey at the U-16, U-17 and U-18 levels before he made his debut for the senior team in 2003.

Club career
Arslan began his career with local club Hannover 96. After making 36 league appearances for the club, Arslan was transferred to Rot-Weiss Essen. Adanaspor brought Arslan to the club in 2000. He joined Kocaelispor in 2002, spending six months with the club before moving to Galatasaray on 31 January 2003. After leaving Galatsaray, Arslan played for Ankaraspor, Gaziantepspor, Antalyaspor and MKE Ankaragücü.

On 19 August 2011, he signed for Bozüyükspor.

International career
Arslan has made eleven appearances for the Turkey national football team, including participating at the 2003 FIFA Confederations Cup. He also represented Turkey at the U-16 to U-18 levels, as well as making two appearances for the senior reserve team in 2006.

Honours
Turkey
FIFA Confederations Cup third place: 2003

References

External links
 
 
 

1978 births
Living people
Footballers from Hanover
German people of Turkish descent
Turkish footballers
Turkey international footballers
Turkey B international footballers
2003 FIFA Confederations Cup players
Hannover 96 players
Hannover 96 II players
Rot-Weiss Essen players
Adanaspor footballers
Kocaelispor footballers
Galatasaray S.K. footballers
Ankaraspor footballers
Gaziantepspor footballers
Antalyaspor footballers
MKE Ankaragücü footballers
Orduspor footballers
Eyüpspor footballers
Süper Lig players
2. Bundesliga players
Turkey youth international footballers
Association football midfielders
Turkish football managers